Ceremony is the fifth studio album by British rock band The Cult, first released on 23 September 1991. The most popular songs on the album are “Wild Hearted Son” and “Heart of Soul”.

Album information 
Ceremony represented a period of great turmoil within the band. Longtime bassist Jamie Stewart had departed prior to recording, and the working relationship between vocalist Ian Astbury and guitarist Billy Duffy was at an all-time low. The pair reportedly rarely agreed to appear at the studio together, opting to record their parts separately at different times.

The album was highly anticipated by both music critics and fans as a result of the band's previous worldwide successes with their 1987 album Electric and its 1989 follow-up Sonic Temple. It was heavily inspired by Native American culture. The band was sued for $61,000,000 by the parents of the Native American boy pictured on the album cover.

The album reached #25 in the U.S. and reached #9 in Canada, and achieved platinum status, but sales suffered with the arrival of grunge rock and time spent dealing with the lawsuit. Some countries, including South Korea and Thailand, did not see the record's release until 1992 and it was unreleased in Turkey until the Cult played several shows in Istanbul in June 1993. It reached #16 on the US Cashbox charts.

Track listing 
All tracks written by Ian Astbury and Billy Duffy.
 "Ceremony" – 6:27
 "Wild Hearted Son" – 5:41
 "Earth Mofo" – 4:42
 "White" – 7:56
 "If" – 5:25
 "Full Tilt" – 4:51
 "Heart of Soul" – 5:55
 "Bangkok Rain" – 5:47
 "Indian" – 4:53
 "Sweet Salvation" – 5:25
 "Wonderland" – 6:10

Track information 
Both "Ceremony" and "Wild Hearted Son" begin with Native American Indian dances. "White" includes an excerpt from Lawrence Lipton's 1959 book 'The Holy Barbarians', which was later the name of Astbury's band, formed in 1996. "Heart of Soul" begins with the lyric "Down and out in London, Los Angeles, and Paris too", which is a reference to George Orwell's 'Down and Out in Paris and London', with LA being where the band were based at that time.

"Wild Hearted Son" (UK#40, Canada #41) was the first officially released single, followed by "Heart of Soul" (UK#51). "Sweet Salvation" and "Heart of Soul" were both released as promotional only singles in Argentina in 1992, and "Ceremony" was released as a promotional single in Spain.

Personnel 
The Cult
 Ian Astbury - vocals, backing vocals
 Billy Duffy - guitar
Additional personnel 
 Alex Acuña - percussion
 Mickey Curry - drums
 Charley Drayton - bass
 Tommy Funderburk - backing vocals
 Donny Gerrard - backing vocals
 Suzie Katayama - cello
 Mona Lisa - backing vocals
 Yvonne St. James - backing vocals
 Benmont Tench - organ
 Scott Thurston - synthesizer, piano
 Richie Zito - keyboards
Technical
 Mixed by Mike Fraser

References 

The Cult albums
1991 albums
Beggars Banquet Records albums
Albums produced by Richie Zito